Perawan Desa is a 1978 Indonesian drama film directed by Frank Rorimpandey. The film won five awards at the Indonesian Film Festival in 1980.

Accolades

References 

Citra Award winners
Indonesian-language films
1978 films
1978 drama films
Indonesian drama films